Archbishop Pierre (Boutros) Mouallem (born 10 May 1928) is the retired Melkite Greek Catholic Archbishop of Akko, Haifa and the Galilee, in Israel.

Biography

Mouallem was born in Eilabun, Galilee, in 1928 and received his education at the Minor and Major Seminaries of St. Paul Missionaries, Harissa, Lebanon, and was ordained a priest in 1955.

From 1955 to 1975 he taught Arabic literature, French literature and humanities (Classical Greek and Latin) at the Seminary of St. Paul, Harissa, Lebanon. Then he taught philosophy, sociology and patristics at St. Anne of Jerusalem (Salahiyeh). He finally returned to Lebanon to teach theology, liturgy and Islamology at St. Paul's High Institute, Harissa.

From 1975 to 1987 he was superior general of St. Paul's Society. He was consecrated bishop of Melkite Greek Catholic Eparchy of Nossa Senhora do Paraíso em São Paulo, Brazil, on 29 June 1990. In 1998, the Melkite Synod elected him Archbishop of Galilee. He resigned on 10 May 2003 due to his age.

He is active in seeking interfaith reconciliation and for championing the rights of Palestinians. He also currently sits on the Board of World Religious Leaders for the Elijah Interfaith Institute.

His election as archbishop of Galilee was actively opposed by the government of Israel, who said that he favours the Palestine Liberation Organization, resulting in a row between the Holy See and the government of Prime Minister Benjamin Netanyahu. The Holy See noted that selection of a bishop was matter reserved for the Church, "free of all external pressure," and that the Fundamental Accord between the Holy See and the State of Israel "provides for the autonomy of Church and State, each one in its own area." Sources close to Netanyahu said that he wanted to make a "courteous persuasion" in favour of the competing candidate after the PLO began to insistently intervene in favour of Mouallem.

Later, in October 2002, Archbishop Mouallem was prevented by Israeli airport guards from leaving Jerusalem to attend an interfaith meeting in London.

See also
Palestinian Christians

References

External links
Israeli Prime Minister Challenges Pope on Appointment of Bishop, Zenit News Agency
Catholic Hierarchy

1928 births
Eastern Catholic bishops in Brazil
Brazilian Melkite Greek Catholics
Living people
Melkite Greek Catholic bishops
Israeli Melkite Greek Catholics
People from Northern District (Israel)
Lebanese emigrants to Brazil
Mandatory Palestine people